The arrondissement of Mulhouse is an arrondissement of France in the Haut-Rhin department in the Grand Est region. It has 79 communes.

Composition

The communes of the arrondissement of Mulhouse are:

Attenschwiller
Baldersheim
Bantzenheim
Bartenheim
Battenheim
Berrwiller
Blotzheim
Bollwiller
Brinckheim
Bruebach
Brunstatt-Didenheim
Buschwiller
Chalampé
Dietwiller
Eschentzwiller
Feldkirch
Flaxlanden
Folgensbourg
Galfingue
Geispitzen
Habsheim
Hagenthal-le-Bas
Hagenthal-le-Haut
Hégenheim
Heimsbrunn
Helfrantzkirch
Hésingue
Hombourg
Huningue
Illzach
Kappelen
Kembs
Kingersheim
Knœringue
Kœtzingue
Landser
Leymen
Liebenswiller
Lutterbach
Magstatt-le-Bas
Magstatt-le-Haut
Michelbach-le-Bas
Michelbach-le-Haut
Morschwiller-le-Bas
Mulhouse
Neuwiller
Niffer
Ottmarsheim
Petit-Landau
Pfastatt
Pulversheim
Ranspach-le-Bas
Ranspach-le-Haut
Rantzwiller
Reiningue
Richwiller
Riedisheim
Rixheim
Rosenau
Ruelisheim
Saint-Louis
Sausheim
Schlierbach
Sierentz
Staffelfelden
Steinbrunn-le-Bas
Steinbrunn-le-Haut
Stetten
Uffheim
Ungersheim
Village-Neuf
Wahlbach
Waltenheim
Wentzwiller
Wittelsheim
Wittenheim
Zaessingue
Zillisheim
Zimmersheim

History

The arrondissement of Altkirch was created in 1800. In 1857 the subprefecture was moved to Mulhouse. In 1871 it was disbanded when the area was ceded to Germany. The arrondissement of Mulhouse was restored in 1919. In January 2015 it absorbed five communes of the former arrondissement of Guebwiller and two communes of the former arrondissement of Thann.

As a result of the reorganisation of the cantons of France which came into effect in 2015, the borders of the cantons are no longer related to the borders of the arrondissements. The cantons of the arrondissement of Mulhouse were, as of January 2015:

 Habsheim
 Huningue
 Illzach
 Mulhouse-Est
 Mulhouse-Nord
 Mulhouse-Ouest
 Mulhouse-Sud
 Sierentz
 Wittenheim

References

Mulhouse